Tunkhannock Creek is a  tributary of the Susquehanna River in Northeastern Pennsylvania.

English translations of the Lenni-Lenape Tunkhannock vary, including "meeting of the waters", "small stream", "wilderness stream", and "wooded stream". Most sources note, however, that hanna, as in Susque-, Toby-, Loyal-, Tunkhannock, and Lackawanna, suggests "moving water."

Tunkhannock Creek is traced northeast along PA Highway 92 to its source of Cheraine Pond near Jackson. It has an eastern branch that rises in Herrick Township to the east and north of Elk Mountain and a southern branch that rises near Montdale in Scott Township.  Tunkhannock Creek's major tributaries include, Nine Partners Creek, East Branch Tunkhannock Creek, Horton Creek, Martins Creek, Hop Bottom Creek, and South Branch Tunkhannock Creek.

The  Erie Lackawanna Railway Tunkhannock Viaduct (called locally the "Nicholson Bridge"), featuring multiple high concrete arches, passes over the creek near Nicholson.

Tunkhannock Creek empties into the Susquehanna at Tunkhannock in Wyoming County.

South Branch Tunkhannock Creek

See also
List of rivers of Pennsylvania

References

External links
U.S. Geological Survey: PA stream gaging stations

Rivers of Pennsylvania
Tributaries of the Susquehanna River
Rivers of Susquehanna County, Pennsylvania
Rivers of Wyoming County, Pennsylvania